TelstraSuper is a multi-award winning profit-to-members superannuation fund that is open for anyone to join. The fund is based in Melbourne, Australia. 

Originally established in 1994 exclusively for Telstra employees, today everyone can join TelstraSuper. It’s Australia’s largest corporate superannuation fund with over $23 billion in assets invested on behalf of members. 

TelstraSuper members can access a range of services including online tools and calculators, personalised dashboards, insurance, webinars, seminars and more. They can also get simple help about their TelstraSuper account over the phone at no additional cost - it’s part of the membership. 

TelstraSuper members can access comprehensive financial advice through TelstraSuper Financial Planning.

In 2022 TelstraSuper was named Highest Super Performer and Best Property Superannuation Product in Money Magazine’s “Best of the Best” awards. 

The fund was also awarded Pension Fund of the Year by two separate organisations - Chant West and SuperRatings.

History
TelstraSuper was established in 1990 and has grown to become Australia's largest corporate super fund. The fund was initially established for the sole benefit of Telecom employees and named the Telecom Superannuation Scheme. 

After being renamed the Telstra Superannuation Scheme in 1996, the fund extended its membership eligibility in 2007 to include former Telstra employees and the eligible family of existing Telstra Super members.

In 2022 the membership eligibility further extended to invite anyone to join - meaning you no longer need to have an association with Telstra to join .

Awards
TelstraSuper was named Highest Super Performer and Best Super Property Product in the 2023 Money Magazine “Best of the Best” awards. 

The fund has also consistently held the top Platinum rating from independent ratings agency SuperRatings in recognition of being a "best value for money" superannuation fund for the last eighteen years (to 2023). 

In 2022, TelstraSuper was also named Pension Fund of the Year by both SuperRatings and Chant West.  Chant West also awarded the fund as Best Fund Insurance. 

TelstraSuper was named a 2022 ESG Leader by Rainmaker. The ESG Leader Rating is earned by Australian superannuation funds that are implementing ESG (environmental, social and governance) principles to a high level while having a track record of solid investment performance.

Structure
TelstraSuper operates under the direction of the TelstraSuper Board of Directors, led by independent Chair Anne-Marie O’Loghlin. The current Chief Executive Officer is Chris Davies, the current Chief Financial Officer is Paul Curtin and the current Chief Investment Officer is Graeme Miller.

TelstraSuper membership is open to everyone.  The fund currently offers 10 investment options, which have generally achieved returns above the industry median.

References

Australian companies established in 1990
Financial services companies established in 1990
Telstra
Superannuation funds in Australia